The 2016 FAM Youth Championship was the 5th season of the FAM Youth Championship.

Teams
Under-21 teams of the 8 clubs in 2016 Dhivehi Premier League will be contesting in the championship.

Format
Eight teams competing will be engaged in a round-robin tournament, each team plays once against the others. Three points are awarded for a win, one for a draw and zero for a loss. The teams are ranked in the league table by points gained, then goal difference, then goals scored and then their head-to-head record. The top 4 teams will be qualified for the Play-offs.

Page playoff system was used in this edition. The first and second place teams play each other, with the winner advancing directly to the final. The winner of the other page playoff game between the third and fourth place teams plays the loser of the first/second playoff game in the semi-final. The winner of the semi-final moves on to the final.

League table

Play-offs

Page play-offs

Semi-final

Final

Awards

Best 4 players
 Ansar Ibrahim (Club Eagles)
 Ali Haafiz (TC Sports Club)
 Mohamed Inshal (Maziya)
 Adam Im'aan (Club Eagles)

Best coach
 Ahmed Shakir (Club Eagles)

Fair play team
 Maziya

References

FAM Youth Championship
4